Elma Mitchell (November 19, 1919 Airdrie, Lanarkshire -  November 23, 2000) was a Scottish poet.

Life
She won a scholarship to Somerville College, Oxford, where she gained a first in English in 1941.

She went on to achieve a diploma in librarianship at the School of Librarianship, University College London.

She worked as a librarian and information officer for the BBC (1941–43).

She moved to Buckland St Mary, Somerset, and worked as a freelance writer.

Awards
 1977 Cheltenham Festival Poetry Competition
 1999 Cholmondeley Award

Works

Anthologies

References

External links
 
 

1919 births
2000 deaths
Alumni of Somerville College, Oxford
20th-century Scottish poets